Bryan High School may refer to:

Bryan High School (Ohio), located in Bryan, Ohio
Bryan High School (Texas), located in Bryan, Texas
Omaha Bryan High School in Omaha, Nebraska

See also
Bryan Station High School in Lexington, Kentucky
Bryant High School (disambiguation)